Mareyopsis is a plant genus of the family Euphorbiaceae first described as a genus in 1919. It is native to western and central Africa.

Species
 Mareyopsis longifolia (Pax) Pax & K.Hoffm. - Nigeria, Cameroon, Gabon, Equatorial Guinea, Congo-Brazzaville, Zaire
 Mareyopsis oligogyna Breteler - Gabon

References

Acalypheae
Euphorbiaceae genera
Flora of West-Central Tropical Africa
Flora of Nigeria